The Brazilian radiolated swamp turtle (Acanthochelys radiolata) is a species of turtle in the Chelidae family  endemic to Brazil.

References

Acanthochelys
Turtles of South America
Endemic fauna of Brazil
Reptiles of Brazil
Near threatened animals
Near threatened biota of South America
Reptiles described in 1820
Taxonomy articles created by Polbot